HPU may refer to:

Universities
 Hawaii Pacific University, in Honolulu, Hawaii, US
 High Point University, in High Point, North Carolina, US
 Himachal Pradesh University, in Shimla, Himachal Pradesh, India
 Howard Payne University, in Brownwood, Texas, US
 Henan Polytechnic  University, in Jiaozuo, Henan, China

Computing
 Hogel processing unit, a parallel computation device for a holographic light-field display
 Holographic processing unit, a custom coprocessor by Microsoft

Other uses
 Hapur Junction railway station (station code), in India
 Team Hitec Products, a professional cycling team
 Home plate umpire in baseball